The Alyawarre, also spelt Alyawarr and also known as the Iliaura, are an Aboriginal Australian people, or language group, from the Northern Territory. The Alyawarre are made up of roughly 1,200 associated peoples and actively engage in local traditions such as awelye painting.

Country
Notable sites associated with their nomadic world include Mount Swan, northern flank of Harts Range, Plenty River north and west of Ilbala, Jervois Range, Mount Playford and the Elkedra River. They were also present at MacDonald Downs and Huckitta.

Language

The Alyawarre people speak a dialect of Upper Arrernte known as Alyawarre.

Social organisation
The Alyawarre had a four-section marriage system.
 Pitjara
 Kngwarija
 Kimara
 Pula

Demography
C. L. Yallop estimated the Alyawarre community to number 500-600 people in 1969. They were mainly concentrated at Lake Nash, the Georgina River, McDonald Downs, on the Bundey River, and the Warrabri Reserve.

In the 2016 Australian Census, there were 347 Alyawarre recorded in the "Utopia - Arawerr - Arlparra" Indigenous location. Only 4% of households only spoke English at home.

Native title
In 1980 the Alyawarre made a land claim together with the Anmatyerre for the Utopia pastoral lease. In the same year, the lodged a claim along with the Wakaya people for land around the remote outstation of Purrukwarra. As a result, they were handed back  on 22 October 1992, while the Wakaya were given , both only small parts of the original claim.

Alternative spellings
 Aliawara, Alyawara, Alyawarra
 Alyawarr, Aljawarra
 Ilawara
 Iliaura, Illiaura, Iljaura, Ilyaura
 Illura
 Ilyowra Illyowra
 Jaljuwara
 Yalyuwara

Source:

Some words
 . (kangaroo)
  (emu)
 . (dog, dingo)
 . (honey-ant)

Source:

Notable people
 Emily Kame Kngwarreye, artist
 Ngarla Kunoth who played Jedda in the 1956 Chauvel film of the same name, now Chancellor of Batchelor Institute of Indigenous Tertiary Education
 Kathleen Petyarre is an Alyawarre / Eastern Anmatyerre artist
 Gloria Petyarre, artist
 Nancy Petyarre, artist
 Jeanna Petyarre, artist
 Minnie Pwerle, artist (from Alyawarre and Anmatyerre language groups)
 Elkin Reilly played for South Melbourne in the Victorian Football League (VFL)
 Barbara Weir, artist

Notes

Citations

Sources

Aboriginal peoples of the Northern Territory